Mordellistena xanthocephala is a species of beetle in the genus Mordellistena of the family Mordellidae. It was described by Blair in 1922.

References

External links
Coleoptera. BugGuide.

Beetles described in 1922
xanthocephala